American Tragedy may refer to:

Books
 An American Tragedy, a 1925 novel by Theodore Dreiser
 Nuremberg and Vietnam: An American Tragedy, a 1970 nonfiction book by Telford Taylor
 American Tragedy: The Uncensored Story of the Simpson Defense, a 1996 nonfiction book by James Willwerth and Lawrence Schiller about the O. J. Simpson murder case
 American Tragedy: Kennedy, Johnson, and the Origins of the Vietnam War, a 2000 nonfiction book by David E. Kaiser

Music
 The American Tragedy, an American rock band
 American Tragedy (band), an American metalcore band
 As I Lay Dying/American Tragedy, a 2002 split album by bands As I Lay Dying and American Tragedy
 American Tragedy (album), a 2011 album by rap-rock group Hollywood Undead
 American Tragedy Redux, a 2011 remix album of the Hollywood Undead album American Tragedy

Television, film and theater
 An American Tragedy (film), a 1931 Paramount film directed by Josef von Sternberg based on Dreiser's novel
 An American Tragedy (musical), a 1995 stage musical adaptation of Dreiser's novel
 An American Tragedy (opera), a 2005 adaptation of Dreiser's novel by Tobias Picker
 American Tragedy (film), a 2000 television miniseries about O.J. Simpson's trial based on the 1996 book
 Ruby Ridge: An American Tragedy, a 1996 mini-series about a 1992 siege in Idaho, US
 Scottsboro: An American Tragedy, a 2001 historical film about the Scottsboro Boys